Almagro is an administrative neighborhood of Madrid belonging to the district of Chamberí.

External links

Wards of Madrid
Chamberí